The Best of Joe R. Lansdale is a collection of short stories published exclusively by Tachyon Publications as a trade paperback in 2010. This collection contains many classic short fiction published by Mr. Lansdale over the last 20 years and contains many of his most popular and famous works.

Table of contents
Crucified Dreams: Introduction by Joe R. Lansdale
Godzilla's Twelve-Step Program 
Bubba Ho-Tep| Link to video article
Mad Dog Summer
Fire Dog
The Big Blow
Duck Hunt
Incident On and Off a Mountain Road| Link to video article
The Events Concerning a Nude Foldout found in a Harlequin Romance
White Mule, Spotted Pig
On the Far Side of the Cadillac Desert With Dead Folks
Not From Detroit
Cowboy
Steppin' Out, Summer, '68
Fish Night
Hell Through a Windshield
Night They Missed the Horror Show

References

External links
Author's Official Website
 Collection's Official Website
Cover Artist's Website

Short story collections by Joe R. Lansdale
2010 short story collections
Horror short story collections
Works by Joe R. Lansdale
Tachyon Publications books